The City of Sheridan is a home rule municipality located in Arapahoe County, Colorado, United States. Sheridan is a part of the Denver–Aurora–Lakewood, CO Metropolitan Statistical Area. The population was 5,664 at the 2010 census.

Geography
Sheridan is located at  (39.648920, -105.017681).

Demographics

As of the census of 2000, there were 5,600 people, 2,236 households, and 1,372 families residing in the city. The racial makeup of the city was 77.00% White, 1.88% African American, 2.20% Native American, 1.68% Asian, 0.07% Pacific Islander, 12.54% from other races, and 4.64% from two or more races. Hispanic or Latino of any race were 32.52% of the population.

There were 2,236 households, out of which 30.3% had children under the age of 18 living with them, 39.9% were married couples living together, 15.2% had a female householder with no husband present, and 38.6% were non-families. 31.7% of all households were made up of individuals, and 12.5% had someone living alone who was 65 years of age or older.  The average household size was 2.50 and the average family size was 3.14.

In the city, the population was spread out, with 26.2% under the age of 18, 10.1% from 18 to 24, 30.5% from 25 to 44, 20.6% from 45 to 64, and 12.6% who were 65 years of age or older.  The median age was 35 years. For every 100 females, there were 103.2 males.  For every 100 females age 18 and over, there were 103.1 males.

The median income for a household in the city was $34,984, and the median income for a family was $38,500. Males had a median income of $29,655 versus $22,500 for females. The per capita income for the city was $16,635.  About 9.0% of families and 11.8% of the population were below the poverty line, including 15.3% of those under age 18 and 11.3% of those age 65 or over.

Brief history
Sheridan was originally part of the Indian Territory and has always been a small community. The first white settler of what would become Sheridan was John McBroom in the spring of 1859. He homesteaded . The town was initially named Petersburg. McBroom built his first log cabin near Bear Creek which he later abandoned in 1866 when he married Emma J. Bennett. He prospered as a farmer and found a viable market in Denver for his goods. The laying out of the town of Sheridan is credited to Isaac. He was also responsible for the name change from Petersburg to Sheridan. Isaac McBroom's cabin can be toured at the Littleton Historical Museum.

Another prominent figure in Sheridan's early history was Peter Magnes. Originally from Sweden, Magnes was a farmer who immigrated to the United States at the age of 26. In 1859, his first daughter was born on the banks of Cherry Creek. He also purchased  of land and built a small log cabin. In 1865 Magnes laid out the town of Petersburg and encouraged Swedish families to immigrate to his town. The town had a railroad, hotel, blacksmith, church, newspaper, post office and, of course, taverns. The state of Colorado was formed in 1876, putting Sheridan within its new boundaries.

Citizens began moving toward incorporation of Sheridan in January 1890. There was some dispute among the petitioners about boundaries, and the final results were filed in February 1890. On April 14, 1890, the town of Sheridan was incorporated.

Sheridan gets its name from U.S. Army General Philip H. Sheridan. General Sheridan established Fort Logan, which was originally known as the "Camp close to Denver". It was on the site known as the Johnson Tract, south of the city, with a water supply, the proximity of the railroad, "available space for a parade ground, artesian well possibilities, the beautiful view and the distance from Denver and its saloons." Because of the military post Sheridan continued to flourish. However, eventually the post was shut down, and it is now a mental health facility that borders Sheridan.

Sheridan has remained a community that continues to influence the surrounding areas, most recently with current redevelopment projects.

Education
The Sheridan School District operates area public schools.

Legend
Sheridan was the setting for the short-lived western TV series Legend. When the writers originally chose the name, they were not aware that the town of "Sheridan, Colorado" existed. The show takes place in 1876, some time before Sheridan was incorporated.

See also

Outline of Colorado
Index of Colorado-related articles
State of Colorado
Colorado cities and towns
Colorado municipalities
Colorado counties
Arapahoe County, Colorado
List of statistical areas in Colorado
Front Range Urban Corridor
North Central Colorado Urban Area
Denver-Aurora-Boulder, CO Combined Statistical Area
Denver-Aurora-Broomfield, CO Metropolitan Statistical Area

References

External links
City of Sheridan official website
CDOT map of the City of Sheridan
Sheridan Historical Society

Cities in Arapahoe County, Colorado
Cities in Colorado
Denver metropolitan area
Populated places established in 1890